In June 2012, the Scotland rugby union team made a tour of Australia, Fiji and Samoa, playing one test match against each.

The tour began with Scotland's second consecutive win over Australia, meaning they retained the Hopetoun Cup. (They had beaten Australia 9–8 at Murrayfield in 2009.) Scotland then travelled to Fiji, becoming the first "Tier 1" nation to play a test in a Pacific Island nation since Italy visited Fiji in 2006. Scotland recorded away victories over both Fiji and Samoa.

Scotland were also scheduled to play the New South Wales Waratahs on 10 June, but this match was called off on 11 May as the Waratahs were unable to field a team "due to injuries and the requirements of the Wallabies squad."

Squad 
Initial 28-man squad, named on 16 May. Ages and caps correct as of 5 June 2012.

Head coach:  Andy Robinson

The following players were called up during the tour:

Matches

Australia v Scotland

 Six players made their full international debuts for Australia: Dan Palmer, Dave Dennis, Michael Hooper, Mike Harris, Joe Tomane and Luke Morahan.
 Two players made their full international debuts for Scotland: Ryan Grant and Tom Brown.

Fiji v Scotland

 Tim Visser made his debut for Scotland, only four days after becoming eligible by completing three years' residency.

Samoa v Scotland

 Originally, New Zealand referee Chris Pollock was meant to referee this match, but due to injury, Jaco Peyper of South Africa took over. He is the same referee who refereed both the Australia and the Fiji game.
 It was announced just 50 minutes before kick off that Nick De Luca was out of the match due to thigh strain, and would be replaced by Joe Ansbro.

Tour statistics

See also 
 2012 mid-year rugby test series
 2012 England rugby union tour of South Africa
 2012 Wales rugby union tour of Australia
 2012 Ireland rugby union tour of New Zealand
 2012 France rugby union tour of Argentina
 History of rugby union matches between Fiji and Scotland
 History of rugby union matches between Samoa and Scotland
 History of rugby union matches between Australia and Scotland

References

External links 
2012 Scotland rugby union tour of Australasia at ESPN

2012
2011–12 in Scottish rugby union
2012
2012
2012
2012 rugby union tours
2012 in Oceanian rugby union
2012 in Fijian rugby union
2012 in Samoan rugby union
2012 in Australian rugby union
History of rugby union matches between Australia and Scotland